Abu Nur Muhammad Ehteshamul Haq (1927 – 17 February 2002), known as Captain Ehtesham, was a Bangladeshi and Pakistani film director.  On his death in 2002 he was described as a pioneer of the film industry in Dhaka, and one of Bangladesh's leading directors.

Birth and early life
Ehtesham was born in Dhaka on 12 October 1927. His father, Mohammad Yusuf, was a professor at Islamia College and his mother, Mosammat Kaniz Fatema, was a house wife.

Career
Ehtesham first became a film cinema distributor in 1950. He was credited with the discovery of many noted actors.  In 1956 he began his first film, Ei Desh Tomar Amar ("This country is yours and mine"), which marked the first film acting appearance for both Subhash Dutta and Shabnam.  He made successful films in Urdu and then, after the independence of Bangladesh, in Bengali.  Another discovery was actor Nadeem, who later married Ehtesham's daughter. Ehtesham directed Nadeem and actress Shabana in Nadeem's debut (and Shabana's first Urdu film) Chakori in 1967. He also launched two other successful actresses - Shabnur in Chandni Raate (1993) and Munmun in Moumachi'' (1996).

Filmography

See also
Cinema of Bangladesh

References

Footnotes

Bibliography

External links

Bangladeshi film directors
People from Dhaka
Pakistani film directors
1927 births
Nigar Award winners
2002 deaths